Pros and cons, derived from the Latin words "pro" (for) and "contra" (against), may refer to:

 Pros and Cons (TV series), a television series that aired from 1991 to 1992
 Pros & Cons, a 1999 film starring Larry Miller and Tommy Davidson
 Pros & Cons (comic strip), a comic strip by Kieran Meehan
 "Pros and Cons", an episode of Garfield and Friends
 "Pros and Cons", an episode of The A-Team
 Decisional balance sheet, a table of pros and cons

See also
 Con (disambiguation)
 Pro (disambiguation)
 Issue mapping, a diagram in which pros and cons are types of nodes